Troye-d'Ariège is a commune in the Ariège department in southwestern France.

Population
Inhabitants of Troye-d'Ariège are called Troyens.

See also
Communes of the Ariège department

References

Communes of Ariège (department)
Ariège communes articles needing translation from French Wikipedia